Grace Elizabeth Stabell Schwab Keliher (born August 3, 1963) is a Minnesota politician and former member of the Minnesota Senate.  A member of the Republican Party of Minnesota, she represented District 27, which includes all or portions of Freeborn and Mower counties in the southeastern part of the state.

Early life, education, and career
Born Grace Elizabeth Stabell in Tallahassee, Florida, Keliher graduated from New Ulm High School in New Ulm, Minnesota. She attended college at Minnesota State University, Mankato in Mankato, Minnesota, graduating with her Bachelor of Science (B.S.) in 1986. For 10 years, she served on the Albert Lea School Board.

Minnesota Senate

Elections
Keliher was elected to the Senate in 2000. She ran for reelection in 2002 and lost to Dan Sparks by seven votes after an automatic recount.

Committee assignments
For the 82nd Legislative Session, Schwab was part of the:
Crime Prevention 
Education 
Education Subcommittee: Early Childhood-Grade 12 Education Budget Division 
Education Subcommittee: Workforce Education 
Taxes 
Taxes Subcommittee: Income and Sales Tax Budget Division 
Transportation

Tenure
Keliher was sworn in on January 3, 2001. On April 6, 2001, she was appointed to the Minnesota Chicano Latino Affairs Council (Board of Directors).  Schwab's first legislative action was authoring a bill that raised the standards for school bus drivers and provided more protection for children.

Lawsuit
Malcolm W. Prinzing accused Keliher of theft. Prinzing had put a sign on the property of Northbridge Mall in Albert Lea in opposition to a school levy. Keliher saw the sign and spoke to the manager of the mall about it. She and the manager removed letters from the sign to make it more neutral. Prinzing went after her in her 2002 reelection campaign, calling her a thief. He took her to court and lost. The jury awarded Keliher $150,000 for defamation. Prinzing appealed to the Minnesota Court of Appeals, but the court upheld the decision.

Personal life
Keliher was married to Steve Ray Schwab. They have three children and divorced in 2005. In 2008, she married Thomas "Tom" Eugene Keliher. She has four stepchildren.

References

External links

1963 births
Living people
School board members in Minnesota
Women state legislators in Minnesota
Republican Party Minnesota state senators
People from Albert Lea, Minnesota
People from Tallahassee, Florida
Minnesota State University, Mankato alumni
21st-century American politicians
21st-century American women politicians